Zeebo Extreme is a series of 3D racing videogames created for the Zeebo system. The games were developed by the Tectoy Digital studio in Campinas, Brazil. To date, five Zeebo Extreme games have been introduced in Brazil and four in Mexico.

Each of the games involves a race over air, water or land in a particular type of vehicle, such as an airplane, billy cart or jet board. In single player mode, the player competes against the game. In two-player mode, players race against each other. The games offer a variety of courses, levels of difficulty and power-ups. The games use either the standard Zeebo Z-Pad gamepad or the Boomerang control, a motion-sensitive controller similar to the Wii Remote.

Games

Released games

References

External links
 Zeebo Brazil Games Page 

2009 video games
Zeebo games
Zeebo-only games
Video games developed in Brazil
Video games set in Brazil
Racing video games